Christophe Laurent (born 26 July 1977 in Mende, Lozère) is a French former professional road cyclist.

Major results

2001
 1st  Overall Les Boucles d'Artois
 1st Stage 8 Tour de Bretagne
 2nd Overall Tour de Gironde
1st Stage 3
2002
 1st  Mountains classification Tour de l'Avenir
2006
 6th Overall Circuit de Lorraine
2007
 1st  Mountains classification Tour of California
2009
 6th Overall Rhône-Alpes Isère Tour
1st Stage 3
 7th Tour du Doubs
 8th Les Boucles du Sud Ardèche
 9th Overall Tour de Normandie
 9th Overall Tour du Gévaudan Languedoc-Roussillon

External links 
 

1977 births
Living people
People from Mende, Lozère
French male cyclists
Sportspeople from Lozère
Cyclists from Occitania (administrative region)